Beech Creek is an unincorporated community located in Muhlenberg County, Kentucky, United States.

History
A post office called Beech Creek has been in operation since 1906. The community took its name from nearby Beech Creek.

References

Unincorporated communities in Muhlenberg County, Kentucky
Unincorporated communities in Kentucky